Don Bosco SC was a Sri Lankan football club located in Negombo.

Achievements
Sri Lankan Premier League: 1
Winner: 2010.

Performance in AFC competitions
AFC President's Cup: 1 appearance
2011: 4° in Group Stage

External links
Football Federation of Sri Lanka
Don Bosco Technical Centre
Soccerway statistics

Football clubs in Sri Lanka